André van den Heuvel (4 June 1927 – 9 February 2016) was a Dutch actor. He appeared in more than 55 films and television shows between 1957 and 2008.

Filmography

References

External links

1927 births
2016 deaths
Dutch male film actors
People from Tegelen
20th-century Dutch male actors